Peter Robert Johnson, is a Birkenhead-based businessman and football investor.

The son of a butcher, Johnson helped run a family-owned business Park Foods, a supplier of Christmas hampers in the early 1990s. During this time, Johnson was an investor in Tranmere Rovers football club, during which time they rose from the foot of the Football League to the Championship, and was chairman of Everton F.C. until 1999.

After having an estimated fortune of £150M in the early 1990s, Johnson's fortune dropped to £58M in 2004.

Park Foods
The son of a butcher, Johnson branched the family butchery business out into a Christmas Savings club in 1967. The Park Hamper Company was formed in 1969, and Park Foods became a weekly cash savings business.

By the early 1990s, Birkenhead based Park Foods had made Johnson one of the UK's richest people, with an estimated fortune of £150M. At its peak, Park Foods packed 1m Christmas hampers and delivered them to people who had saved up to £5 a week all year. Johnson also became chairman of Nightfreight GB when it went public on the London Stock Exchange in 1993.

In the mid-1990s Johnson branched his interests out into both football and flavoured crisps, after which Park Foods lost  £6.2M in first half of 1997. By Christmas 2004, due partly to competition from supermarkets, Park packed just 75,000. Park Group's cash lending book - where loans are typically £300 - between 2003 and 2004 grew 82% to £24.6m.

In October 2004, Johnson put the group valued at around £49M up for sale, after the failure of both the flavoured crisp and door-step loan businesses. Park Group was rebranded Appreciate Group plc in 2019.

Football

Tranmere Rovers

Johnson was a Liverpool F.C. supporter from boyhood, and a former shareholder. In 1987, Johnson was approached by local football club Tranmere Rovers, to take over running of the club and restore stability, after American Bruce Osterman ran up large debts. Johnson took control of the then Fourth Division (fourth tier) club, and they rose to the Second Division (third tier) by 1990. In 1992, they won promotion to the second tier league winning the playoffs at Wembley.

Everton

Johnson also had a spell at Everton which lasted for four years. After Everton avoided relegation in 1994, Johnson agreed to inject £10M via a rights issue into Everton F.C., as advised by NM Rothschild from a Jersey based family trust 

The Football Association ruled that one person could not own a controlling interest in more than one club. In accordance with this, Johnson agreed to sell shares in one club by 1998, and resultantly appointed his then girlfriend Lorraine Rogers to look after his interests at Tranmere. It was believed that Johnson would sell his shares in Tranmere, and it was speculated by the press on more than one occasion that he had.

On Christmas Eve 1999, Everton Chairman Bill Kenwright struck a deal ahead of other consortia, including one headed by Johnson's rival meat-seller Gerry White, to buy Johnson's 68% controlling stake in Everton for £20M – thus valuing the club at £30M.

Refocus on Tranmere

Upon his return Johnson had returned to Tranmere as President and installed Rogers as chairman. In 2000, the team went on a high-profile cup run, beating several Premier League clubs (Coventry, Middlesbrough and Bolton) en route to the League Cup final where they met Leicester City F.C. and lost 2-1.

The teams were relegated in 2001/02 from the Championship (second tier) to the League One (third tier) after ending the season in 24th.

Johnson had the club up for sale since 2002. In summer 2006, Tranmere revealed accounts which showed the club owed Johnson £6M, and had plans to sell-off their second training ground at Ingleborough Road as a residential development. In August 2009 when it was revealed that Johnson's football club Tranmere Rovers had been put up for sale on eBay. Johnson had hired Dornoch Capital, a specialist in selling sports franchises, to sell his shareholding. The listing was removed immediately following a public outcry. A controlling interest in the club was sold to Mark Palios and his wife on 11 August 2014, who became the club's new owners.

References

External links
Park Group plc
Bio at Toffeeweb

1939 births
Living people
Everton F.C. directors and chairmen
Businesspeople from Liverpool
People educated at Birkenhead Park School